is a Buddhist temple in the city of Kainan, Wakayama Prefecture, Japan.  It belongs to the Tendai school of Japanese Buddhism. Its main image is a statue of Shaka Nyorai. Its Hondō, Tahō-tō Pagoda and are Daimon National Treasures, and its daimyō cemetery is a National Historic Site.

History
The early history of Chōhō-ji is not well-documented. Per the temple's own account, it was founded by a disciple of Ennin in the year 1000 at the request of Emperor Ichijō. Originally, it was situated to the west of its current location, and was relocated the Kamakura period. The existing Main Hall, Tahōtō and Daimon were built from the end of the Kamakura period to the Nanboku-chō period. The temple declined during the Sengoku period, but was revived in the early Edo period under the sponsorship of Asano Yoshinaga, daimyō of Kishū Domain.

In 1666, Tokugawa Yorinobu, who had replaced the Asano clan as daimyō, decided to make the temple the bodaiji for the Kishū Tokugawa clan, and in 1672 Tokugawa Mitsusada donated estates with a kokudaka of 500 koku for the temple's upkeep. On the eastern slopes of the mountain behind the precincts, a large cemetery was created for the Kishū Tokugawa clan, with the exceptions of the tombs of the 5th daimyō (Tokugawa Yoshimune) and 13th  daimyō (Tokugawa Iemochi), who (as shogun), had their tombs at Kan'ei-ji in Edo. There are 28 tombs in the cemetery, twelve of which are for various  daimyō, and the remainder are for their wives and children. Each tomb is surrounded by a stone fence, with a granite-paved floor and basalt approach and walls. The shape of the tombstone itself varies depending on the generation. There are also a total of 330 stone tōrō lanterns.

The temple is about nine minutes by car from Shimotsu Station on the JR West Kisei Main Line.

Cultural properties
Main Hall - National Treasure. Rebuilt in 1311.
Tahōtō - National Treasure. Rebuilt in 1357.
Daimon - National Treasure. Rebuilt in 1388.
Chinju-dō - Important Cultural Property.  It was rebuilt in Kamakura period.

Gallery

See also 
List of National Treasures of Japan (temples)
List of Historic Sites of Japan (Wakayama)

References

External links 

 CHOHOJI TEMPLE , NATIONAL TREASURE
 Map of precincts

1000s establishments in Japan
1000 establishments in Asia
National Treasures of Japan
Important Cultural Properties of Japan
Pagodas in Japan
Tendai temples
Buddhist temples in Wakayama Prefecture
Kainan, Wakayama
Kii Province
Historic Sites of Japan